Jacques des Rousseaux (1600, Tourcoing – 1638, Leiden), was a French Baroque painter active in Leiden.

Biography
According to the RKD he was a pupil of Rembrandt in Leiden from 1630 onwards. He is known for genre works in the manner of Rembrandt.

References

Jacques des Rousseaux on Artnet
Jacques des Rousseaux at PubHist

1600 births
1638 deaths
French Baroque painters
People from Tourcoing
Pupils of Rembrandt
Emigrants from France to the Holy Roman Empire